Rachel H. Hunt is a member of the North Carolina State Senate. A Democrat, Hunt was elected in November 2022 to represent Senate District 42 in Mecklenburg County, North Carolina. Prior to that, Hunt served two successful terms in the North Carolina House beating incumbent Republican Rep. Bill Brawley twice.

Biography
Hunt is the daughter of state’s longest serving Governor and First Lady Jim and Carolyn Hunt. She attributes her passion for public service to watching her parents devote over two decades to making North Carolina a leader in the South. An attorney and certified College Counselor, she is a graduate of the University of North Carolina at Chapel Hill and the University of South Carolina School of Law. A mom of two, and spouse to a practicing Addictive Disease physician, Hunt believes policies should always support North Carolina families.

Legislative history 
Despite serving in the minority, Hunt helped pass several pieces of bipartisan legislation including clean energy legislation to cut carbon emissions by 70%. Hunt has also co-sponsored bills to codify Roe v. Wade and expand Medicaid. She has stood with Governor Roy Cooper to protect North Carolinians from extremist policies that attack women, families, schools and businesses.

Committee assignments

2023-2024 Session 

 Agriculture, Energy, and Environment
 Appropriations on General Government and Information Technology
 Judiciary
 Pensions and Retirement and Aging

2021-2022 Session
Appropriations 
Appropriations - Education
Education - Community Colleges (Vice Chair)
Education - K-12
Families, Children, and Aging Policy 
Judiciary I

2019-2020 Session
Appropriations 
Appropriations - Capital 
Education - Community Colleges
Agriculture Committee
Families, Children, and Aging Policy
Judiciary

Electoral history
Hunt was first elected to the North Carolina House of Representatives in 2018, after defeating the incumbent Republican Representative Bill Brawley. The 2018 race was decided by only 68 votes after being one of the most expensive legislative races in the state that year. Hunt was re-elected in 2020 by 9.86% in a rematch against Brawley. In 2022 Hunt was elected to the North Carolina State Senate to replace Senator Jeff Jackson who vacated the seat to run for the United States Senate. On November 8, 2022 Hunt defeated Cheryl Russo in the race to represent the 42nd State Senate district.

2022

2020

2018

References

|-

Living people
North Carolina Democrats
Members of the North Carolina House of Representatives
Democratic Party members of the North Carolina House of Representatives
North Carolina state senators
Democratic Party North Carolina state senators
21st-century American politicians
North Carolina lawyers
Year of birth missing (living people)
Rachel
People from Charlotte, North Carolina
University of North Carolina at Chapel Hill alumni
University of South Carolina alumni